The 2011 Men's EuroHockey Championship II was the 4th edition of the Men's EuroHockey Championship II, the second level of the European field hockey championships, and the first edition with the new name. It was held from the 8th until the 14th of August 2011 in Vinnytsia, Ukraine.  The tournament also served as a qualifier for the 2013 EuroHockey Championship, with the finalists Czech Republic and Poland qualifying.

Qualified teams

Format
The eight teams were split into two groups of four teams. The top two teams advanced to the semifinals to determine the winner in a knockout system. The bottom two teams played in a new group with the teams they did not play against in the group stage. The last two teams were relegated to the Men's EuroHockey Championship III.

Results
All times were local (UTC+2).

Preliminary round

Pool A

Pool B

Fifth to eighth place classification

Pool C
The points obtained in the preliminary round against the other team are taken over.

First to fourth place classification

Semi-finals

Third place game

Final

Final standings

 Qualified for the 2013 EuroHockey Championship

 Relegated to the EuroHockey Championship III

See also
2011 Men's EuroHockey Championship III
2011 Men's EuroHockey Nations Championship
2011 Women's EuroHockey Championship II

References

EuroHockey Championship II
Men 2
EuroHockey Championship II Men
Sport in Vinnytsia
EuroHockey Championship II Men
International field hockey competitions hosted by Ukraine